Joseph John Kohn (born May 18, 1932) is a professor emeritus of mathematics at Princeton University, where he researches partial differential operators and complex analysis.

Life and work 
Kohn's father was Czech-Jewish architect Otto Kohn. After Nazi Germany invaded Czechoslovakia, he and his family emigrated to Ecuador in 1939. There Otto attended Colegio Americano de Quito. In 1945, Joseph moved to the United States, where he attended Brooklyn Technical High School. He studied at MIT (S.B. 1953) and at Princeton University, where he obtained his PhD in 1956 under Donald Spencer ("A Non-Self-Adjoint Boundary Value Problem on Pseudo-Kähler Manifolds"). Later he was at the Institute for Advanced Study during 1957/58  (and again 1961/62, 1976/7, 1988/89).

From 1956/57, Kohn was an instructor at Princeton. In 1958, he served as assistant professor, in 1962, associate professor and in 1964, professor at Brandeis University, where he also served as Chairman of the Mathematics Department (1963-1966). Since 1968, he has been a professor at Princeton University, where he served as chairman from 1993 to 1996. He was a visiting professor at Harvard (1996/7), Prague, Florence, Mexico City (the Center for Research and Advanced Studies of the National Polytechnic Institute of the National Polytechnic Institute), Stanford, Berkeley, Scuola Normale Superiore (Pisa), Rome, Buenos Aires, and at IHES.

Kohn's work focuses, among other things, on the use of partial differential operators in the theory of functions of several complex variables and microlocal analysis. He has at least 65 doctoral descendants.

Kohn was a Sloan Fellow in 1963 and a Guggenheim Fellow on 1976/77. From 1976 to 1988, he was a member of the editorial board of the Annals of Mathematics. In 1966, he was an invited speaker at the International Congress of Mathematicians in Moscow ("Differential complexes").

Film director Miloš Forman was his half-brother through their father Otto Kohn.

Awards and honors 
Since 1966, Kohn has been a member of the American Academy of Arts and Sciences and a member of the National Academy of Sciences since 1988. In 2012, he became a fellow of the American Mathematical Society (AMS).

Kohn won the AMS's Steele Prize in 1979 for his paper Harmonic integrals on strongly convex domains. In 1990, he received an Honorary Doctorate from the University of Bologna. In 2004, he was awarded the Bolzano Prize.

Literature 

Bloom, Catlin, D´Angelo, Siu (Herausgeber) Modern methods in complex analysis. Papers from the conference honoring Robert Gunning and Joseph Kohn on the occasion of their 60th birthdays held at Princeton University 1992, Princeton University Press (PUP) 1995

References

External links 

Curriculum Vitae of Joseph J. Kohn
Leroy P. Steele prizes

1932 births
Living people
Czech Jews
Princeton University alumni
Harvard University staff
Princeton University faculty
20th-century American  mathematicians
21st-century American  mathematicians
Complex analysts
PDE theorists
Members of the United States National Academy of Sciences
Fellows of the American Mathematical Society
Mathematicians from Prague
Brooklyn Technical High School alumni